First-seeded Helen Wills Moody defeated Eileen Bennett Whittingstall 6–4, 6–1 in the final to win the women's singles tennis title at the 1931 U.S. National Championships.

Seeds
The tournament used two lists of eight players for seeding the women's singles event; one for U.S. players and one for foreign players. Helen Wills Moody is the champion; others show in brackets the round in which they were eliminated.

  Helen Wills Moody (champion)
  Helen Jacobs (quarterfinals)
  Anna McCune Harper (quarterfinals)
  Marion Zinderstein Jessup (third round)
  Marjorie Morrill (second round)
  Marjorie Gladman Van Ryn (second round)
  Dorothy Weisel (quarterfinals)
  Josephine Cruickshank (third round)

  Betty Nuthall (semifinals)
  Phyllis Mudford (semifinals)
  Dorothy Round (third round)
  Eileen Bennett Whittingstall (finalist)
  Dorothy Shepherd-Barron (quarterfinals)
  Joan Ridley (third round)
  Elsie Goldsack Pittman (third round)
  Baroness Maud Levi (first round)

Draw

Final eight

References

1931
1931 in women's tennis
1931 in American women's sports
Wom